Minor Amendments were insignificant variation in a detail and details of a Planning permission which would not raise any new issues which would warrant the submission of a fresh Planning application.

They would allow for small changes to be made often as a result of modifications arising for practical reasons during the course of construction.

Many local authorities had established protocols for dealing with such amendments.

The legal basis upon which this is allowed has recently been challenged in Case law.

Notably:-
Reprotech (Pebsham) Ltd v East Sussex CC (Lords)
Henry Boot Homes Ltd v Bassetlaw DC (Court of Appeal)
Sage v Secretary of State for the Environment, Transport and the Regions (Lords)
Pioneer Aggregates Ltd v Secretary of State for the Environment [1985] 1AC

References 

United Kingdom planning law